Mariana Navarro de Guevarra Romero (17 January 1565 – 17 April 1624) was a Spanish Roman Catholic nun who became a member of the Mercedarian Tertiaries. Upon admittance she took the name of Mariana of Jesus. She was noted for a life of penance and the emphasis of devotion to the Eucharist.

Pope Pius VI beatified her after the recognition of two miracles and the cause still continues. Another miracle is now under investigation and is needed for canonization.

Life
Mariana Navarro de Guevarra Romero was born in 1565 in Madrid as the oldest of six children and was the sole female child. Her father was Ludovico Navarro Guevara and her mother was Joan Romero. She was pious as a child and cared for her brothers after the death of her mother. Her father remarried and her new stepmother seemed to dislike her for unknown reasons to her. Her father desired that she get married and leave home but she desired to be married to Jesus Christ and to devote her life to him. She turned down a marriage proposal at the age of 23.

Romero met a priest who suggested to her that she become a member of a religious order known as the Mercedarians. She spent hours in worship of the Eucharist and counseled people who came to her for advice. She was well known for her patience and kindness with all those that she came across.

She became one of several tertiaries into the order who took their final profession in mid 1614 and devoted herself to charitable acts towards the sick and the poor.

She died on 17 April 1624 after a severe illness with a widespread reputation for holiness. Her remains were later found to be incorrupt upon exhumation in 1627 and then in 1731. Other exhumations took place in 1765 and 1924. Cardinal Gabriel Trejo Paniagua - Bishop of Malaga wrote a detailed and long report on her life.

Beatification

The introduction to the cause of beatification bestowed upon her the title of Servant of God and it opened in Madrid. Pope Clement XIII recognized her life of heroic virtue and proclaimed her to be Venerable on 9 August 1761.

Pope Pius VI approved two miracles attributed to her intercession on 31 August 1782 and beatified her in 1783.

A third miracle attributed to her and needed for her canonization was investigated from 8 March 2011 to 11 November 2013 and received formal ratification on 2 May 2014.

References

External links
Hagiography Circle
Saints SQPN

1565 births
1624 deaths
Spanish beatified people
Mercedarian beatified people
16th-century venerated Christians
17th-century venerated Christians
People from Madrid